Tanzania competed at the 1996 Summer Olympics in Atlanta, United States.

Athletics

Men
Track & road events

Women
Track and road events

Boxing

Men

See also
Tanzania at the 1994 Commonwealth Games
Tanzania at the 1998 Commonwealth Games

References
Official Olympic Reports
sports-reference

Nations at the 1996 Summer Olympics
1996
Olympics